There are more than 15,000 documented Scottish country dances; only the most frequently  danced or otherwise notable ones are listed here.

Dances are marked with the music and dance styles used: R8×32 3C/4 means a Reel of 32 bars repeated 8 times for 3 couples in a set of 4 couples in a longwise set. The letters for the music styles are: R reel;   J jig;   P polka;   S strathspey;   W waltz.

Anniversary Reel – R4×32 4C set – Sheila Muir 1987
Awa', Whigs, Awa' (R8x32) 3C (4C set) Hugh Foss Dances to Song Tunes
The Bees of Maggieknockater – J4×32 4C set – John Drewry 1975
The Belle of Bon Accord – S4×32 4C set – John Drewry 1981
Blooms of Bon Accord – R4×32 4C set – John Drewry 1971
Bratach Bana – J8x32 3C/4 – John Drewry 1964
Clutha – R4×48 Square set – unknown 1890
Canadian Barn Dance - 
Dashing White Sergeant – 32 bar reel 3 facing 3 round the room – unknown
The De'il Amang the Tailors – R8×32 3C/4 – unknown
The Dream Catcher  – S96 Square set – Eileen Orr
The Duke and Duchess of Edinburgh – R8×40 3C/4 – Allie Anderson & Florence Lesslie
The Duke of Atholl's Reel – J8×32 3C/4 – Skillern 1776
The Duke of Perth – R8x32 3C/4 – unknown 1827
The Earl of Mansfield – R4x48 4C – John Drewry 1980
The Eightsome reel – R40+8x48+40 Square set – unknown 1870
Fergus McIver (a.k.a. Waverley) – J8x48 3C/4 – Button and Whittaker 1812
Flowers of Edinburgh – R8x32 3C/4 Hornpipe – unknown
The Frisky – J8x32 3C/4 – Robert Bremner
Gay Gordons – 16 bar round the room march – unknown
Hamilton House – J8x32 3C/4 – William Campbell 1789
Hooper's Jig – J8x32 3C/4 – unknown
Ian Powrie's Farewell to Auchterarder  – J128 Square set – Bill Hamilton
Joie de Vivre  – J8x32 3C/4 – Irene van Maarseveen
The Haymakers (a.k.a. Sir Roger de Coverley) – 48 bar 9/8 jig – unknown
Inverneill House – R8x32 3C/4 – John Drewry 1986
The Irish Rover – R8×32 3C/4 – James B Cosh
J.B. Milne – R8x32 3C/4 – Hugh Foss 1954
Jennifer's Jig – J8×32 3C/4 – John Drewry  1968
MacDonald of the Isles – S3×32 3C – Derek Haynes
The Machine without horses – J8x32 3C/4 – Rutherford 1772
Mairi's Wedding – R8x40 3C/4 – James B. Cosh 1959 (See also Wedding music)
Major Ian Stewart – J8x32 3C/4 – John Drewry 1986
Maxwell's Rant – R8x32 3C/4 – Rutherford 1752
Miss Johnstone of Ardrossan – R5x32 5C – Roy Goldring 2000
Mrs Stewart's Jig – J8x32 3C/4 – Frans Ligtmans 1986
The Minister on the Loch – S3×32 3C – Roy Goldring
The Montgomeries’ Rant – R8x32 3C/4 – Castle Menzies 1749
Monymusk – S8x32 3C/4 – Preston 1786
Napier's Index – J8x40 3C/4 – Brian Charlton 2001
Neidpath Castle – S3×32 3C – Derek Haynes
Pelorus Jack – J8×32 3C/4 – Barry Skelton 1993
Petronella – R8x32 2C/4 – unknown 1808
Postie’s Jig – J4x32 4C – Roy Clowes
Quarries' Jig – J8x32 3C/4 – Kent W Smith
The Reel of the Royal Scots – R8×32 3C/4 – Roy Goldring 1983
The Reel of the 51st Division – R8x32 3C/4 – James Edward McCartney Atkinson 1940
Rest and Be Thankful – R8x32 3C/4 – unknown
The Robertson Rant – S80 Square – Mrs  Douglas Winchester 1949
The Sailor – R8x32 3C/4 – unknown
Scottish Reform – J8x32 2C/4 – unknown
Shiftin’ Bobbins – R8x32 3C/4 – Roy Clowes
Speed the Plough (Inverness Country Dance) – R8x32 3C/4 – unknown
Strip the Willow – 40 or 56 bar jig in either 6/8 or 9/8 time (in 9/8 it is also known as "Drops of Brandy") – unknown
Sugar Candie – S8×32 3C/4 – unknown
Swiss Lassie – R8×32 3C/4 – Rosi Betschi
A Trip to Bavaria – R4x32 4C – James MacGregor-Brown
Up in the Air – S8x32 3C/4 – Boag 1797
Virginia Reel -R4x40 4C – unknown
The Wee Cooper o' Fife – J8x40 2C/4 (10 bar phrases) – Hugh Foss
West's Hornpipe – R4×32 4C – unknown 1797
The White Heather Jig – J4x40 4C – James B Cosh
The Wild Geese – J8x32 3C/4 – unknown
Wind on Loch Fyne – S3x32 Triangle – John Bowie Dickson 1986
The Wind That Shakes the Barley – R8x32 3C/4 – John M Duthie 1961

See also 
 Scottish highland dance

References

External links
Scottish Country Dancing Dictionary includes printable Dance Instruction Cribs alphabetically ordered.
DanceData web interface, database of Scottish country dances: more than 12,000 entries and information on music and recordings.
Minicrib is a database of nearly 4000 dances which enables cribsheets to be printed out.
A selection of core dances RSCDS April 2008

 
Scotland-related lists
British entertainment-related lists